Dream Snow is a children's picture book written and illustrated by Eric Carle. Published in 2000 by Philomel Books, the musical and sound effects book is about a farmer who celebrates Christmas after the first snowfall.

Reception
The Horn Book wrote: "Carle's newest picture book is eye-catching, but the story is slim." Booklist wrote: "Visual and musical gimmicks enhance Carle's signature bright, textured collages in this holiday-cum-counting story." Kirkus Reviews wrote: "The venerable and prolific Carle (Hello, Red Fox, 1998, etc.) offers a quiet Christmas story with a little music at the end."

References

2000 children's books
American picture books